Bo Win, also written as  'Bowin', is a tambon (subdistrict) of Si Racha District, Chonburi Province, Thailand.

Naming
The condition of the area in the past, the roads were filled with potholes. When cars pass by, they tend to fall into potholes, so tools like winches or wheels need to help pull them up.

The first element 'Bo' (Thai: บ่อ) means 'pothole'; the second element 'Win' (Thai: วิน) is a word that is mispronounced from the word 'wheel' in English.

Geography
Bo Win is a southern part in Si Racha District of Chonburi Province close to neighbouring Rayong Province. It is lined midway between Si Racha and Bang Lamung Districts. It's topography is a plain and slope interspersed with high hills and small mountains.

Adjoining subdistricts are, clockwise from north, Nong Kham and Khao Khansong in its district, Map Yang Phon in Pluak Daeng District of Rayong Province, Takhian Tia in Bang Lamung District, Bueng in its district.

Administration & population
The entire area of Bo Win is administered by two local government bodies: Chaophraya Surasak City Municipality and Subdistrict Administrative Organization (SAO) Bo Win.

It was also divided into eight muban (village).

Only the part of the SAO Bo Win covers an area of 39 sq km (15 sq mi), with an average population density of 400 people per sq km (based on April 2014 data).

In 2017, it had a total population of 40,825.

Economy
Bo Win can be regarded as an industrial estate, part of eastern seaboard, like nearby areas such as Laem Chabang, Map Ta Phut. In its area there are five industrial estates.

Bo Win is also home to many residences in various types such as condominium, housing estate, detached house.

In term of agriculture, pineapple, cassava, and rubber are the cash crops.

Transportation
Highway 331 is a main thoroughfare. The area is also served by minibus or van from Bangkok.

References

Tambon of Chon Buri Province